Roxenisse is a former municipality in the Dutch province of South Holland. It consisted of a single polder to the west of the village of Melissant.

The municipality was formed in 1817 and only existed until 1857, when it became part of Melissant.

References

Former municipalities of South Holland